, sometimes referred to simply as Yukimura, is a Michelin 3-star kappo restaurant in Azabu-Jūban, Minato, Tokyo, Japan. It is owned and operated by chef .

Restaurant
Chef Jun Yukimura opened the restaurant in 2000 after working as a cook in Kyoto for 25 years. Yukimura, located in the Minato ward of Tokyo, contains only nine seats for tables in addition to seating at the counter.

Food is prepared at the restaurant using ingredients sourced primarily from Kyoto.

See also
 List of Japanese restaurants
 List of Michelin three starred restaurants
 List of sushi restaurants

References

Tourist attractions in Tokyo
Restaurants in Tokyo
Michelin Guide starred restaurants in Japan
Sushi restaurants in Japan